Louie Sam ( – February 24, 1884) was a Stó:lō youth from native village near Abbotsford, British Columbia who was lynched by an American mob.

Sam was 14 at the time these events occurred.  He had been accused of the murder of James Bell, a shopkeeper in Nooksack (today Whatcom County, Washington).  The people of his band, today the Sumas First Nation at Kilgard turned him over to the B.C. government to settle the matter.

Following this, an angry mob crossed the border into Canada on February 24 and captured Sam, who had been in the custody of a B.C. deputy awaiting his trial at New Westminster.  They then hanged him from a tree close to the U.S. border.

A subsequent investigation by Canadian authorities strongly suggests that Sam was innocent and that the likely murderers were two white Americans who were leaders of the lynch mob. They were William Osterman, the Nooksack telegraph operator who took over Bell's business, and David Harkness, who at the time of Bell's murder was living with Bell's estranged wife.  Neither man was ever prosecuted.

On March 1, 2006, the Washington State Senate and House of Representatives approved a resolution stating that "through this resolution, the Senate joins its peers in the government of British Columbia, acknowledging the unfortunate historical injustice to Louie Sam and the proud Stó:lō people".

In media

Bibliography 
Notes

References 
 - Total pages: 375 
  
 
 

Year of birth uncertain
1884 deaths
1884 murders in Canada
19th-century First Nations people
Canada–United States relations
Canadian murder victims
First Nations history in British Columbia
History of Washington (state)
Lynching deaths
People murdered in British Columbia
Sto:lo people
1884 murders in the United States